Constance Moore (January 18, 1920 or January 18, 1921 – September 16, 2005) was an American singer and actress. Her most noted work was in wartime musicals such as Show Business and Atlantic City and the classic 1939 movie serial Buck Rogers, in which she played Wilma Deering, the only female character in the serial.

Life and career
Moore was born in Sioux City, Iowa, but her family moved away when she was aged six months and spent most of her formative years in Dallas, Texas. She had at least two siblings, both sisters.  She got a job as a singer in the 1930s with CBS radio. Her work impressed a scout from Universal Studios and she signed a contract with the company. Among the stars she worked with was W. C. Fields in You Can't Cheat an Honest Man (1939). She appeared on Broadway in the musical By Jupiter.

Beginning in mid-1945, Moore starred with Dennis O'Keefe on Hollywood Mystery Time on ABC radio.

She retired from films in 1947 but made sporadic appearances over the next few decades. She appeared on a USO tour with Bob Hope and the Nicholas Brothers in 1951. She painted still lifes and in 1976 was the chairwoman for the Braille Institute Auxiliary in Beverly Hills, California.

Moore guest starred as Doris in the episode "Just a Housewife" (1960) on the ABC sitcom, The Donna Reed Show. In the 1961–1962 season, Moore co-starred in ten episodes on CBS as Robert Young's romantic interest in his short-lived nostalgia series, Window on Main Street.

Personal life
At age 18, Moore married her agent, John Maschio, who died in 1998. The couple had two children, son Michael and daughter Gina. Moore was a Republican who campaigned for Thomas Dewey in 1944.

Moore died September 16, 2005, of heart failure following a long illness. She was interred at Westwood Village Memorial Park Cemetery, Los Angeles.

Filmography

 Prescription for Romance (1937) - Girl (uncredited)
 You're a Sweetheart (1937) - (uncredited)
 Border Wolves (1938) - Mary Jo Benton
 Reckless Living (1938) - Girl Singer (uncredited)
 The Crime of Doctor Hallet (1938) - Susan
 State Police (1938) - Helen Evans
 The Last Stand (1938) - Nancy Drake
 Wives Under Suspicion (1938) - Elizabeth
 Prison Break (1938) - Maria Shannon
 Letter of Introduction (1938) - Autograph Seeker (uncredited)
 The Missing Guest (1938) - Stephanie Kirkland
 Freshman Year (1938) - Marian Stuart
 Swing That Cheer (1938) - Marian Stuart
 You Can't Cheat an Honest Man (1939) - Victoria Whipsnade
 Buck Rogers (1939, Serial) - Wilma Deering
 Ex-Champ (1939) - Doris Courtney
 Mutiny on the Blackhawk (1939) - Helen Bailey
 When Tomorrow Comes (1939) - Bride (uncredited)
 Hawaiian Nights (1939) - Lonnie Lane
 Laugh It Off (1939) - Ruth Spencer
 Charlie McCarthy, Detective (1939) - Sheila Stuart
 Framed (1940) - Phyllis Sanderson
 Ma! He's Making Eyes at Me (1940) - Connie Curtiss
 La Conga Nights (1940) - Helen Curtiss
 Argentine Nights (1940) - Bonnie Brooks
 I'm Nobody's Sweetheart Now (1940) - Betty Gilbert
 Las Vegas Nights (1941) - Norma Jennings
 I Wanted Wings (1941) - Carolyn Bartlett
 Buy Me That Town (1941) - Virginia Paradise
 Take a Letter, Darling (1942) - Ethel Caldwell
 Show Business (1944) - Constance Ford
 Atlantic City (1944) - Marilyn Whitaker
 Delightfully Dangerous (1945) - Josephine 'Jo' Williams / Bubbles Barton
 Earl Carroll Vanities (1945) - Drina
 Mexicana (1945) - Alison Calvert
 In Old Sacramento (1946) - Belle Malone
 Earl Carroll Sketchbook (1946) - Pamela Thayer
 Hit Parade of 1947 (1947) - Ellen Baker

References

External links
 

Actresses from Iowa
Actresses from Texas
American film actresses
American television actresses
Burials at Westwood Village Memorial Park Cemetery
Actors from Sioux City, Iowa
People from Dallas
20th-century American singers
1920s births
2005 deaths
California Republicans
20th-century American women singers
20th-century American actresses
Universal Pictures contract players
21st-century American women